Ben or Benjamin Young may refer to:

 Ben Young (artist) (born 1973), Anglo-American artist based in London
 Ben Young (motorcyclist) (born 1993), American Grand Prix motorcycle racer
 Benjamin Stanley Young (1851–1934), Magistrate of the British Overseas Territory of the Pitcairn Islands

See also

Benjamin Yeung (disambiguation)